The Kammerzell House (Alsatian: Kammerzellhüs, French: Maison Kammerzell, German: Kammerzellhaus) is one of the most famous buildings of Strasbourg and one of the most ornate and well preserved medieval civil housing buildings in late Gothic architecture in the areas formerly belonging to the Holy Roman Empire.

Built in 1427 but twice transformed in 1467 and 1589, the building as it is now historically belongs to the German Renaissance but is stylistically still attached to the Rhineland black and white timber-framed style of civil (as opposed to administrative, clerical or noble) architecture.

It is situated on the Place de la Cathédrale, north-west of the Strasbourg Cathedral, with whose rosy colour it contrasts in a picturesque way when seen from the opposite direction.

The building's inside has been decorated on all floors by lavish frescoes by Alsatian painter Léo Schnug (1878-1933). It now houses a restaurant.

Gallery

External links 

 

Houses in France
Medieval architecture
Restaurants in Strasbourg
Tourist attractions in Strasbourg
Monuments historiques of Strasbourg
Buildings and structures completed in 1427
1420s establishments in the Holy Roman Empire